The 1959 New Jersey State Senate elections were held on November 3.

The elections took place midway through the second term of Governor Robert Meyner. Eleven of New Jersey's 21 counties held regular elections for Senator; Cumberland County also held a special election to complete the unexpired term of W. Howard Sharp, who died in December 1958.

Democrats gained three seats (including the vacant seat in Cumberland) and nearly won control of the New Jersey Senate for the first time since 1915; only 567 votes separated victorious Republican Robert C. Crane and Democrat H. Roy Wheeler in Union County.

Incumbents not running for re-election 
All ten incumbents ran for re-election.

Summary of results by county

Close races 
Seats where the margin of victory was under 10%:

 
 
 
 
  gain

Burlington

Camden

Cape May

Cumberland (special)

Essex

Gloucester

Middlesex

Monmouth

Salem

Somerset

Union

Warren

References 

New Jersey State Senate elections
New Jersey State Senate